Ningjiaping is a town of You County, in the east of Hunan province, China. Merging Pingyangmiao and Hunan'ao townships, the town was created on November 26, 2015. In 2015 it had a population of 48,200. Its administrative centre is Ningjiaping Community.

Subdivisions 
Ningjiaping Town has 20 villages and a community under its jurisdiction.

Community
 Ningjiaping
20 villages
 Biwu
 Daxiang
 Daxing
 Dukou
 Huanggong
 Jinshui
 Lianhe
 Longquan
 Longtian
 Longwang
 Paishan
 Pingshuang
 Pingtang
 Pingtang
 Shuangfan
 Shuangsong
 Shuangtian
 Tianxin
 Xiawan
 Zili

References

Divisions of You County